Better Times is a 1919 American silent comedy film directed by King Vidor.
 A print survives in the EYE Institut Filmmuseum Nederlands. Produced by the Brentwood Corporation, the film stars the then unknown Zasu Pitts in an early screen appearance.
 
The picture is the second of four Christian Science “preachment” films that represent a brief phase in Vidor’s output, championing the superiority of self-healing through moral strength, supplemented by the benefits of rural living.

Plot
As described in a film magazine, the plot of the film is as follows.  A western Pennsylvania town has two hotels that have seen better days. Nancy Scroggs (Pitts) is the neglected daughter of Ezra Scroggs (McDonald), who is the chief reason no one visits his hotel, the Lakeview. A gambler and procrastinator, he has succeeded in diverting trade from himself to Si Whittaker (De Vaull), proprietor of the Majestic.

Nancy, finally spurred into action by lines printed on a calendar, takes an ancient automobile used in the hotel's glory days and takes a stand at the train depot. Her one and only passenger is Spike Macauley, champion pinch hitter for a baseball team, who partly for pity and partly for a lark accompanies the girl. Through Spike's advertisement of the culinary department among the summer boarders of the Majestic, the later's guests are soon transferred to Nancy's care. A sudden telegram causes Spike to leave for the city, which leaves Nancy, who believes he has gone to see his sweetheart, sad.

In the days that follow, tragedy hits when Ezra gambles away his life savings and the hotel and then commits suicide. Nancy, using the insurance money from her father, goes to boarding school. While there she writes pretend love letters to herself from a famous ball player whom she only knows as Peter, make believing to have a sweetheart. This leads to a distressing situation, not anticipated by Nancy, when she is entertained at a box party at a ball game with expectations that she will meet her "lover." However, when she looks and sees that Peter (Butler) and Spike are one and the same, and jumps onto the field with joy.

Cast
 ZaSu Pitts as Nancy Scroggs
 David Butler as Peter Van Alstyne
 Jack McDonald as Ezra Scroggs
 William De Vaull as Si Whittaker (as William De Vaulle)
 Hugh Fay as Jack Ransom
 George Hackathorne as Tony
 Julanne Johnston (as Julianne Johnstone)

Footnotes

References
Baxter, John. 1976. King Vidor. Simon & Schuster, Inc. Monarch Film Studies. LOC Card Number 75-23544.
Durgnat, Raymond and Simmon, Scott. 1988. King Vidor, American. University of California Press, Berkeley. 
Gustafsson, Fredrik. 2016. King Vidor, An American Romantic La furia umana. LFU/28 Winter 2016. http://www.lafuriaumana.it/index.php/61-archive/lfu-28/548-fredrik-gustafsson-king-vidor-an-american-romantic  Retrieved June 4, 2020.

External links

1919 films
1919 comedy films
Silent American comedy films
American silent feature films
American black-and-white films
1910s English-language films
Film Booking Offices of America films
Films directed by King Vidor
1910s American films